The 2017–18 season was Plymouth Argyle's first season back in League One since the 2010–11 season, following their promotion from League Two and their 132nd year in existence. Along with competing in League One, the club participated in the FA Cup, EFL Cup and EFL Trophy. The season covers the period from 1 July 2017 to 30 June 2018.

First-Team squad

Statistics

  

  

|-
!colspan=14|Player(s) who left the club:

|}

Goals record

Disciplinary record

Transfers

Transfers in

Transfers out

Loans in

Loans out

Competitions

Friendlies
On 5 May 2017, Plymouth Argyle announced Cardiff City will visit during the pre-season schedule. A week later, it was confirmed the club will visit the Netherlands again this summer playing two friendlies whilst abroad while other friendlies were also announced in England. Two more friendlies were revealed on 25 May 2017.

League One

League table

Result summary

Results by matchday

Matches

FA Cup
On 16 October 2017, Plymouth Argyle were drawn at home against Grimsby Town in the first round. A second round away trip to Bradford City was confirmed.

EFL Cup
On 16 June 2017, Plymouth Argyle were drawn away to Bristol City in the first round.

EFL Trophy
On 12 July 2017, Plymouth were drawn against Chelsea U23s, Exeter City and Yeovil Town in Southern Group D.

References

Plymouth Argyle
Plymouth Argyle F.C. seasons